Wayne Wheeler is the founder of the United States Lighthouse Society. A retired Coast Guard officer, he founded the society in 1984.

The American Lighthouse Coordinating Committee presented him with the H. Ross Holland Award. He received the Heritage Award from The Foundation of Coast Guard History for creating the United States Lighthouse Society.

References 

Living people
Year of birth missing (living people)